Raszowa may refer to the following places in Poland:
Raszowa, Lower Silesian Voivodeship (south-west Poland)
Raszowa, Opole County in Opole Voivodeship (south-west Poland)
Raszowa, Strzelce County in Opole Voivodeship (south-west Poland)